The Atlas Cedar Biosphere Reserve (established 2016) is a UNESCO Biosphere Reserve located in 
the central Atlas Mountains of Morocco. The biosphere reserve is home to 75% of the world's majestic Atlas cedar (Cedrus atlantica) tree population. Fruit plantations, modern agriculture and tourist activities, which have replaced semi-nomadic pastoral traditions, are taking their toll on scarce water resources. The rich local Berber culture is particularly strong in this area.

Sources

References

Biosphere reserves of Morocco